The 2020 United States presidential election in Minnesota was held on Tuesday, November 3, 2020, as part of the 2020 United States presidential election in which all 50 states plus the District of Columbia participated. Minnesota voters chose electors to represent them in the Electoral College via a popular vote, pitting the Republican Party's nominee, incumbent President Donald Trump, and running mate Vice President Mike Pence against Democratic Party nominee, former Vice President Joe Biden, and his running mate California Senator Kamala Harris. Minnesota has ten electoral votes in the Electoral College.

After narrowly losing the state in 2016, the Trump campaign targeted Minnesota believing it to be in play and seeing it as a chance to expand the political map. This did not pay off as polls of Minnesota voters throughout the campaign showed a clear Biden lead. Prior to the election, 15 out of 16 news organizations projected Minnesota as leaning towards Biden. Minnesota was ultimately carried by Biden by a 7.12% margin, significantly improving over Hillary Clinton's narrow 1.52% margin in 2016. Biden's win marked the twelfth consecutive Democratic presidential win in the state, which has not voted for a Republican since Richard Nixon in 1972, making it the state with the longest Democratic streak still in effect today.

Biden flipped four counties Trump carried in 2016: Clay (Moorhead), Nicollet (North Mankato and St. Peter), Blue Earth (Mankato), and Winona (anchored by the city of the same name), all of which were won by Barack Obama in 2008 and 2012. The key to Biden's success was his performance in the Twin Cities metro area; he outperformed both Clinton and Obama (in either 2008 or 2012) there. His vote share in Hennepin was the highest of any nominee's since Theodore Roosevelt's in 1904. He also improved on Clinton's performance in the Iron Range, although his performance in St Louis, Lake, and Carlton Counties was still well below what Democrats had historically been getting since the New Deal realignment up through 2012. In fact, this was the first time a Republican received greater than 70% of the vote in a Northern Minnesota county since Herbert Hoover in 1928. In addition, Biden managed to flip Minnesota's 2nd congressional district, which houses some of the Twin Cities' southern suburbs, by 6.8 points, after Trump narrowly won it by 1.2 points in the last election.

Throughout the summer leading up to the election, the Twin Cities metro was the epicenter of the summer 2020 BLM protests, given that the murder of George Floyd had taken place in Minneapolis. Trump attempted to court White suburban Minnesotans by using images of rioting and looting in some of his campaign ads and claiming that Biden would "destroy suburbia". These efforts failed, as Biden massively improved in the Twin Cities suburbs, leading to his solid statewide margin of victory. Biden became the first Democrat to win over 70% of the vote in any Minnesota county since former Senator from Minnesota and contemporary Vice President Hubert Humphrey in 1968.

Per exit polls by the Associated Press, Biden carried 51% of White Minnesotans; as well as 58% of college educated voters, and 55% of union households. Trump's areas of strength were in the more rural areas, while Biden performed better in urban and suburban areas. Biden became the first Democrat to win the White House without carrying Koochiching County and Mahnomen County since those counties were formed in 1906, the first Democrat to win without Traverse County since Grover Cleveland in 1892, the first to win without Kittson, Norman, Itasca, and Beltrami Counties since Woodrow Wilson in 1912, and the first to win without Swift County since Wilson in 1916. This is the first time since 1964 in which Minnesota would vote to the right of New Hampshire, another state that has almost always voted Democratic in presidential elections since 1992, albeit usually only by single digit margins of victory.

Primary elections

Republican primary

The Republican primary took place on March 3, 2020. Donald Trump and Bill Weld were among the declared Republican candidates.

Democratic primary

The Democratic primary took place on March 3, 2020. Elizabeth Warren, Bernie Sanders, and former Vice President Joe Biden were among the major declared candidates. Amy Klobuchar, U.S. Senator from Minnesota since 2007, expressed interest in running, and formally declared her candidacy in February 2019, but then withdrew prior to Minnesota's race.

Biden won the most delegates.

Libertarian caucuses

The Libertarian Party of Minnesota used ranked-choice voting to tabulate the results of their caucus. After 7 rounds, Jacob Hornberger was declared the winner.

General election

Final predictions

Polling
Graphical summary

Aggregate polls

Polls

Donald Trump vs. Amy Klobuchar

Donald Trump vs. Bernie Sanders

Donald Trump vs. Elizabeth Warren

with Donald Trump and generic Democrat

with Donald Trump, generic Democrat, and Howard Schultz

Results

Results by county

By congressional district

Counties that flipped from Republican to Democratic
Blue Earth (largest municipality: Mankato)
Clay (largest municipality: Moorhead)
Nicollet (largest municipality: North Mankato)
Winona (largest municipality: Winona)

See also
 United States presidential elections in Minnesota
 2020 United States presidential election
 2020 Democratic Party presidential primaries
 2020 Republican Party presidential primaries
 2020 United States elections
 2020 Minnesota elections

Notes

Partisan clients

References

Further reading

External links
Elections & Voting - Minnesota Secretary of State
 
 
  (State affiliate of the U.S. League of Women Voters)
 

Minnesota
2020
Presidential